A list of fantasy films released in the 1950s.

List

1950s
Fantasy